Sarjeant may refer to the surname of:
Geoff Sarjeant (born 1969), Canadian ice hockey player
Marcus Sarjeant (born 1964), British gunman who fired six blank shots at Queen Elizabeth II in 1981
William Sarjeant (19352002), English-born Canadian geologist